Enterprise is an unincorporated community in Preble County, in the U.S. state of Ohio.

History
The first settlement at Enterprise was made in 1836. A post office was established at Enterprise in 1846, and remained in operation until 1864. Enterprise was not platted until 1880.

References

Unincorporated communities in Preble County, Ohio
Unincorporated communities in Ohio